The Sons of Italy Hall is the former clubhouse of an Italian-American fraternal organization in Hibbing, Minnesota, United States.  It was built in 1930 and stayed active until 1968.  The hall was listed on the National Register of Historic Places in 1980 for its local significance in the theme of social history.  It was nominated for reflecting the diversity of the Iron Range immigrant population and the unique way Hibbing's Italian community organized around clubs rather than churches.

See also
 National Register of Historic Places listings in St. Louis County, Minnesota

References

1930 establishments in Minnesota
1968 disestablishments in Minnesota
Buildings and structures in Hibbing, Minnesota
Clubhouses on the National Register of Historic Places in Minnesota
Cultural infrastructure completed in 1930
Italian-American culture in Minnesota
National Register of Historic Places in St. Louis County, Minnesota
Renaissance Revival architecture in Minnesota